Fardhem is a populated area, a socken (not to be confused with parish), on the Swedish island of Gotland. It comprises the same area as the administrative Fardhem District, established on 1January 2016. The area is rural with farms, tourism and small companies as the main sources of income. It is home to football club Fardhem IF.

Geography 
Fardhem is the name of the socken as well as the district. It is also the name of the small village surrounding the medieval Fardhem Church, sometimes referred to as Fardhem kyrkby. Most of the socken consists of farmed plains on land reclaimed from the drained Mästermyr to the south. Many of the farmed fields still have the same boundaries as in the 18th century.

In the middle of Fardhem is the Sandarve kulle nature reserve. It was established in 1984.

, Fardhem Church belongs to Fardhem parish in Fardhems pastorat.

History 
The locality is mentioned as Farþhaim in the 14th century Gutasaga. The last part of the name hem means "dwelling" or "farm" and the first part fardh means "trail" or "a place where you can travel", it may refer to the Ancylus wall, a remaining bank of the Ancylus Lake that made a good "road" to travel on.

The area has been populated since the Bronze Age. There are grave fields, house foundations, groove stones and two hillforts from the Iron Age. One runestone and a silver treasure from the Viking Age have also been found in Fardhem.

The locality has a wool mill and weapons repair shop.

References

External links 

Objects from Fardhem at the Digital Museum by Nordic Museum

Populated places in Gotland County
Tourism in Sweden
Agriculture in Sweden
Nature reserves in Sweden